The 2022–23 season is the 145th season in the existence of West Bromwich Albion Football Club and the club's second consecutive season in the Championship. In addition to the league, they will also compete in the 2022–23 FA Cup and the 2022–23 EFL Cup.

On 10 October 2022, manager Steve Bruce was sacked after winning only 1 from their opening 13 league games, leaving the club in the relegation places. Spanish coach and former Marcelo Bielsa understudy Carlos Corberán was appointed as his successor on 25 October.

The season also saw increased scrutiny of the club's ownership, and the practices of majority shareholder Guochuan Lai. The club's financial situation began to receive national media attention, having already been commented on frequently in local press. Supporter action groups and in-stadium protests by fans to raise awareness of the club's off-field issues took shape during the season.

Transfers

In

Out

Loans in

Loans out

Statistics

|-
!colspan=14|Players out on loan:

|-
!colspan=14|Players who left the club:

|}

Goals record

Disciplinary record

Pre-season and friendlies
A pre-season trip to Crewe Alexandra was revealed by the hosts on 18 May 2022. On 31 May, Albion confirmed that trip along with a second friendly against Oxford United. A third away pre-season fixture was added to the schedule, against Northampton Town. A trip to Stevenage was next to be announced by the club. On June 17, the Baggies announced a 10-day training camp in Portimão, which included a behind-closed-doors meeting with Leyton Orient. A home friendly against Hertha BSC was next to be added to the calendar.

During the mid-season break, WBA announced they would face Elche in a behind-closed-doors friendly.

Competitions

Overall record

Championship

League table

Results summary

Results by round

Matches

On 23 June, the league fixtures were announced.

FA Cup

The club entered the competition in the third round and were drawn away to Chesterfield. In the fourth round a trip to Bristol City was confirmed.

EFL Cup

WBA were drawn at home to Sheffield United in the first round.

References

West Bromwich Albion
West Bromwich Albion F.C. seasons
English football clubs 2022–23 season